"Kekertaluk Island" also refers to an island off the southeastern tip of the Cumberland Peninsula, at .

Kekertaluk Island is an uninhabited island in the Qikiqtaaluk Region of Nunavut, Canada. It is located in Davis Strait, north of Baffin Island's Cumberland Peninsula and north of Auyuittuq National Park Reserve. Other islands in the immediate vicinity include Manitung Island, Nedlukseak Island, Nudlung Island, Pilektuak Island, Rock Island, and Satigsun Island.

References

Islands of Baffin Island
Islands of Davis Strait
Uninhabited islands of Qikiqtaaluk Region